Trimontium was a Roman fort complex in Scotland. It is located at Newstead, near Melrose, in the Scottish Borders, in view of the three Eildon Hills which probably gave its name (Latin: trium montium, three hills).

It was occupied from about 79 AD to 184 AD and was the largest of the "outpost" forts with associated vicus (settlement) still occupied after the construction of Hadrian's Wall in the 120s AD. It was located 60 miles north of the wall in seemingly "hostile" territory. Trimontium was about three times as big as any fort on Hadrian's Wall and in the later period became the most northerly settlement of the whole Roman Empire.

Trimontium is also considered of international importance as the site of one of the largest caches of Roman military objects in Britain, found in 117 pits.

It was identified by Ptolemy in his Geography.

The fort sits on the banks of the River Tweed, with the Eildon Hills and the Iron Age hillfort atop Eildon North, a visible reminder of both the local population and imposing landscape of the Scottish Borders. The location benefitted from the rivers Tweed and Leader providing routes for the movement of goods and people and from the Roman road that became Dere Street passing alongside the fort.

Historical background

It took the Romans almost four decades, from the invasion of 43AD and subsequent conquest of southern & eastern Britain, followed by expansion into northern England and Wales, for them to be closing in on southern Scotland when the fort was first constructed.

In 79 AD Agricola moved against the Brigantes of northern England and the Selgovae along the southern coast of Scotland, using overwhelming military power to establish Roman control. He built a network of military roads and forts to secure the Roman occupation. Existing forts were strengthened and new ones planted in northeastern Scotland along the Highland Line, consolidating control of the glens that provided access to and from the Scottish Highlands. The line of military communication and supply across southeastern Scotland and northeastern England was Dere Street (on which Trimontium was located) which was well-fortified.

After Agricola was recalled from Britain in 84 AD the Romans retired to a more defensible line along the Forth–Clyde isthmus.

Around 105 there appears to have been a serious setback at the hands of the tribes of the Picts: several Roman forts were destroyed by fire, with human remains and damaged armour at Trimontium indicating hostilities.

In the 120s Hadrian established the frontier further south by building his wall, and Trimontium remained outside it as an "outpost" fort.

The fort's fortunes mirrored that of the later Roman expansion and retreat in the area, as its role swung from frontier post beyond Hadrian's Wall to supply and logistical waypoint for the Antonine Wall after 140 AD, and back to frontier outpost from 164 AD. From its first construction phase in c.80 AD through to the last occupation and retreat shortly after 180 AD the fort would have been a focal point and centre of activity for both Romans and locals alike. The local Iron Age population, living in family farmsteads across the region, and gathering at times within the network of hillforts across the landscape would have had to develop a range of strategies to exist within or alongside the Roman presence. These could vary from alliance and trade to dispute and warfare.

The Fort

The fort was constructed in multiple phases. Dr Simon Clarke of Bradford University has produced a logical sequence of building and destruction for the fort and its annexes. This was managed by combining evidence from the first excavations of James Curle (1905–1910) and Sir Ian Richmond (1947) with aerial photographs and modern search and rescue excavations of Bradford University (1987–1997)

Phase 1 (c.79-87 AD): The earliest occupation of the site was the irregular Agricolan fort established about 80 AD. It had a turf rampart on a cobble foundation with two ditches in front of it, overlapping each entrance. On the west side was an annexe which was also defended by a similar rampart and ditches arrangement.

Phase 2 (c.90-105 AD): After a possible short abandonment of the fort, the Romans were back, and building in strength. Old ditches were filled in and new defences constructed. This resulted in a colossal strengthening of the fort. The new turf rampart was built on a cobble base which measured 13.5 m across and around 8.4 m high. In front of this  was a single ditch between 5 & 7 m wide and 2 to 4 m deep. New, well defended annexes appear on the south, east and probably north sides of the fort, inhabited by civilians and camp followers.

Phase 3 (c.105-137 AD): Trimontium was deserted as the Roman occupiers retreated south of Hadrian's Wall.

Phase 4 (c.137-139 AD): Clarke suggests that evidence points to the possibility that the fort was reoccupied a few years prior to the 140 AD advances into Caledonia by Emperor Antoninus Pius. If this is the case,  the fort would have been a formidable outpost beyond Hadrian's Wall, with a civilian population within the annexes. Excavations and modern archaeology show the main entrance is now positioned through the southern annexe.

Phase 5 (c.140-158 AD): As the Roman presence pressed northwards and work began on the Antonine Wall (from 142 AD), the role of Trimontium changed. It was reduced in size with the building of a 2 m thick masonry wall through the main fort, though at the same time stone was used in the rebuilding. Manufacturing was becoming an important role for this newly purposed supply and logistics centre. Now behind the front line, it is believed that the civilian population attached to the fort may have numbered some 2–3,000.

Phase 6 (c.160 AD): Around this time the previous construction of the subdividing wall was removed as Trimontium's role changed from supply and manufacture to a front line fort due in part to the abandonment of the Antonine Wall. Within the fort a long, narrow barrack block was constructed and evidence points to a large decrease in the civilian population surrounding the fort.

Phase 7 (c.160-184 AD): As the civilian population surrounding and supporting the fort diminished further, the land that housed the annexes returned to a more natural state. The military presence reduced further, with the barrack block now housing the remaining soldiers and their families. The evidence points to the fort being deserted some time around 180 AD. It is unclear whether the remaining civilian population left at this time or remained, outside or even inside the fort. Evidence does point to the potential use of early 3rd and late 4th century coins in the area (coins have been found to the south and to the west of Newstead village). The local population may still have engaged in a Romanised trade and economic pattern of behaviour.

Evidence from the site indicate the presence of a considerable cavalry contingent at Trimontium. The list of such archaeological finds is extensive and includes horse skeletons, multiple parts of horse tack or harnesses, outstanding decorated cavalry parade helmets and face masks that can be seen at NMS Edinburgh, and intriguingly the prospect of a gyrus, or training ring.

During these phases of occupation, the population of the fort varied considerably, the permanent garrison level was probably around 1000 but this number would be complemented by the trades, manufacturers, craftsmen and families associated with the camp during the different phases of occupation. It has been estimated that the number could have risen to anywhere between 2000–5000.

Site archaeology
The earliest modern reference to the archaeological significance of Trimontium stems from finds uncovered during mid-Victorian railway cutting works as part of the Waverley Line construction in 1846. As land to the east of the village of Newstead was worked, finds from pits full of Roman artefacts were uncovered.

Excavations by James Curle between February 1905 and September 1910 began the first exploration of the site, making many findings. These include foundations of successive forts described earlier, which throw much light on the character of this site, an unparalleled collection of Roman armour, including ornate cavalry parade (or 'sports') helmets, horse fittings including bronze saddleplates and studded leather chamfrons, numerous artefacts associated with trade and manufacture, building & construction and daily life on the Roman frontier. In 1911 Curle published his archaeological findings in 'A Roman Frontier Post and its People'. This remarkable volume quickly became a standard reference work, ahead of its time and still the most decisive work published in Scotland covering this period of Roman occupation, expansion and retreat.

Sir Ian Richmond undertook small scale excavations and some re-interpretations of Curle's work in 1947. At this time, with the advent and development of aerial photography as a tool in modern archaeological research, Dr J.K. St Joseph's work at Trimontium revealed up to nine temporary encampments, evidenced through cropmarkings.

In 1989 The Newstead Project began, a 5-year archaeological investigation undertaken by the Department of Archaeological Sciences of Bradford University. Initially under the direction of Dr. Rick Jones, and thereafter Dr. Simon Clarke, the project  employed the most modern archaeological techniques to the Trimontium site for the first time. Clarke uncovered forty major archaeological features in his 1994 'rescue excavation', including six deep pits containing a wealth of organic material. In 1996 he returned to the site to examine the suspected amphitheatre and suspected north annexe and in 1997 the Bradford University team completed the geophysics survey of the Trimontium site.

Museums

The Trimiontium Trust run a museum local to the Trimontium site in the nearby town of Melrose. The museum's £1.4 million redevelopment was part of a project supported by the National Lottery Heritage Fund to enhance and extend the galleries, displays and interpretation of Trimontium's history. The trust carry out guided walks to the Trimontium site, run a lecture and talk series, undertake activities linked to local community events, and present school and family workshops.

Many of the original and later finds from Trimontium are of such quality and importance that they are displayed at the National Museum of Scotland in Edinburgh. Items such as the cavalry helmets and decorative face mask, horse chamfron, leather work and much else besides can be seen as well as other Roman finds.

The Trimontium Trust museum redevelopment project has seen key finds return to the vicinity of the original fort site & archaeological excavations. They are housed within this contemporary museum setting which extends, redesigns, reinterprets and re-displays objects telling the story of Trimontium and its relationship with the local population.

Patrons
Patrons of the Trimontium Trust include:
 HRH The Duke of Gloucester
 The Hon. Gerald Maitland-Carew CVO 
 Andrew Hepburne Scott, Lord Polwarth 
 James Curle's granddaughter, Lady Cameron
 Professor Lawrence Keppie.

References

Bibliography
 Curle, J., 1911, A Roman Frontier Post and its People: The Fort of Newstead in the Parish of Melrose. Glasgow: James Maclehose and Sons.
 Elliot, W., 1994, The Trimiontium Story. Selkirk: The Trimiontium Trust

External links

The Trimontium Trust Museum, Melrose
 The Newstead Project
Curle's Newstead online
NMS Scotland Newstead (Trimontium) objects

1st century in Scotland
2nd century in Scotland
Archaeological sites in the Scottish Borders
History of the Scottish Borders
Roman legionary fortresses in Scotland
Scheduled Ancient Monuments in the Scottish Borders